The 2019–20 Buffalo Sabres season was the 50th season for the National Hockey League franchise that was established on May 22, 1970.

The season was suspended by the league officials on March 12, 2020, after several other professional and collegiate sports organizations followed suit as a result of the ongoing COVID-19 pandemic. On May 26, the NHL regular season was officially declared over with the remaining games being cancelled and the Sabres missed the playoffs for the ninth straight year.

Off-season
The Sabres fired head coach Phil Housley on April 7, 2019, amid a dreadful second half of the season, in which the Sabres had only won 16 of their last 57 games after being on the top of the standings in November. The team hired Ralph Krueger as Housley's replacement on May 15. Krueger's lone NHL head coaching experience was at the helm of the Edmonton Oilers during part of the strike-shortened 2012–13 NHL season; he had also coached Team Europe at the 2016 World Cup of Hockey. He most recently served as the chairman of Southampton F.C., a position that he held for five years.

On May 20, the Sabres unveiled logos for their upcoming 50th anniversary season.

On August 16, the Sabres unveiled their third jersey for the 2019–20 season.

Standings

Divisional standings

Eastern Conference

Schedule and results

Preseason
The pre-season schedule was published on June 18, 2019.

Regular season
The regular season schedule was published on June 25, 2019.

Player statistics

Skaters

Goaltenders

†Denotes player spent time with another team before joining the Sabres. Stats reflect time with the Sabres only.
‡Denotes player was traded mid-season. Stats reflect time with the Sabres only.
Bold/italics denotes franchise record.

Transactions
The Sabres have been involved in the following transactions during the 2019–20 season.

Trades

Free agents

Waivers

Contract terminations

Retirement

Signings

Draft picks

Below are the Buffalo Sabres' selections at the 2019 NHL Entry Draft, which was held on June 21 and 22, 2019, at Rogers Arena in Vancouver, British Columbia.

Notes:
 The St. Louis Blues' first-round pick went to the Buffalo Sabres as the result of a trade on July 1, 2018, that sent Ryan O'Reilly to St. Louis in exchange for Vladimir Sobotka, Patrik Berglund, Tage Thompson, a second-round pick in 2021 and this pick (being conditional at the time of the trade).
 The Vancouver Canucks' fourth-round pick went to the Buffalo Sabres as the result of a trade on June 22, 2019, that sent San Jose's fourth-round pick and Winnipeg's sixth-round pick both in 2019 (122nd and 175th overall) to Vancouver in exchange for this pick.
 The Columbus Blue Jackets' fifth-round pick went to the Buffalo Sabres as the result of a trade on June 22, 2019, that sent Toronto's sixth-round pick and a seventh-round both in 2019 (177th and 191st overall) to Detroit in exchange for this pick.

References

Buffalo Sabres seasons
Buffalo Sabres
Buffalo
Buffalo